Olutanga is a Philippine island in the Moro Gulf, part of Zamboanga Sibugay Province. It is separated from the Zamboanga Peninsula by a narrow channel and Tantanang Bay.

The island is subdivided into 3 municipalities (Mabuhay, Talusan, and the namesake Olutanga), and has a total population of 103,701 people.

See also
 List of islands of the Philippines

References

External links
 

Islands of Zamboanga Sibugay